Mark Landon Johnson (born September 12, 1975) is a former professional baseball player, a catcher who played with several major league teams, but primarily with the Chicago White Sox.  In 2011, he retired as a player and became a minor league manager. He is currently the catching coordinator for the Chicago Cubs. He previously managed the Cubs Double-A affiliate Tennessee Smokies.

Standing at 6'0" and weighing 185 pounds, Johnson attended Warner Robins High School in Warner Robins, Georgia.
Batting left-handed but throwing right-handed, Johnson was drafted by the Chicago White Sox 26th overall in the  draft.

 saw a slight improvement, at least while in Single-A. He hit .257 in 67 games there, but in Single-A Advanced ball that year, he hit only .241.

In , he had a career year in the minors, batting .283 with 105 walks and only 72 strikeouts. That prompted his promotion, and on September 14, at the age of 22, he made his big league debut. He went 0-for-1 at the plate. The rest of his season was not impressive, either-overall, he collected only two hits in 23 at bats, for a .087 batting average. He made the best out of his two hits, though-they were both triples. His first one came off Pedro Martínez on September 19, and his second came off Scott Service on September 25.

He spent his entire  season with the White Sox, backing up Brook Fordyce. In 73 games that season, he hit .227 with four home runs and 16 RBI.

In 75 games, he hit three home runs with 23 RBI.

 was a career year for Johnson. Even though he spent 55 games in the minors, his Major League season would be the best of his career. He hit .249 with 10 sacrifice hits-good for fourth most in the league.

On November 17, 2001 Mark married spouse Jamie Suzanne Webster, In Warner Robins, Georgia.

On December 3, 2002, he was traded with Keith Foulke, Joe Valentine, and cash to the Oakland Athletics for Billy Koch and two players to be named later (who would end up being Neal Cotts and minor leaguer Daylan Holt).

In the thirteen games that he played in the Majors, his batting average was .111.

After the 2003 season, he was granted free agency and signed by the Milwaukee Brewers. Like the season before, he spent most of his time in the minors that year, actually breaking the .250 mark and hitting .259. His time in the Majors was again unimpressive-in eleven at bats, he collected only one hit, for a .097 batting average.

After , he was granted free-agency, but was re-signed by the Brewers, who then traded him to the Chicago Cubs for Travis Ezi. He spent  entirely in the minors, hitting .266 in 60 games. After the 2005 season, he was granted free agency and picked up by the Brewers again.

On November 10, 2006, he signed with the Arizona Diamondbacks and spent the entire year in the minors; though Johnson did have the best season hitting for average in his career, with a .320 batting average. In December , he signed a minor league contract with the St Louis Cardinals and was invited to their  spring training, but did not make the team. He was called up by the Cardinals in September , appearing in the majors for the first time in four years.

One source describes him as this: "He has decent gap power, resulting in his share of doubles, as well as a good eye at the plate. Defensively, he calls a good game and gets the ball quickly down to second base."

Although he has never quite lived up to the "gap power", he has shown a fairly good eye at the plate, with 123 walks and 195 strikeouts so far in his career. His defense is also reliable—his career fielding percentage is .993.

That same source goes on to say this about him: "He has very little home run power and is a fairly light hitter on the whole -- even worse against southpaws."

He has averaged just over two home runs a season in the Majors, and his statistics – .217 batting average with 16 home runs and 81 RBI so far in his career – are rather unsavory. In November 2009 Johnson was granted free agency from the Chicago Cubs. On January 20, 2010, Johnson re-signed a minor league contract with the Cubs.

Minor league manager
In 2011, Johnson managed the Boise Hawks, the Cubs' affiliate in the Class A-Short Season Northwest League.  In 2013, Johnson was named manager of the Kane County Cougars, the Class A affiliate of the Chicago Cubs. In 2015, Johnson was the manager of the Myrtle Beach Pelicans.  He is currently manager of the Tennessee Smokies, an AA affiliate of the Cubs.

References

External links

1975 births
Living people
People from Wheat Ridge, Colorado
Baseball players from Colorado
Chicago White Sox players
Oakland Athletics players
Milwaukee Brewers players
St. Louis Cardinals players
Major League Baseball catchers
People from Warner Robins, Georgia
Minor league baseball managers
Gulf Coast White Sox players
Hickory Crawdads players
South Bend Silver Hawks players
Prince William Cannons players
Winston-Salem Warthogs players
Birmingham Barons players
Charlotte Knights players
Sacramento River Cats players
Indianapolis Indians players
Iowa Cubs players
Nashville Sounds players
Tucson Sidewinders players
Memphis Redbirds players